Anna Chandler (July 4, 1884 – July 10, 1957) was an American vaudeville actress and mezzo-soprano singer of popular and light classical songs.

She was born in New Cumberland, Pennsylvania. Chandler married Jack Curtis, a booking agent. They had one child, Beatrice Curtis, who became an actress and whose first husband was the vaudevillian actor Harry Fox.

Chandler was a headline artist for the Orpheum Circuit. She sang songs in Hebrew and Italian almost exclusively during her career as a headliner on the Orpheum Circuit. On Broadway, Chandler portrayed Mrs. Anastasia Kidd in Jumping Jupiter (1911) and Bessie Bloom in Mendel, Inc. (1929).

Chandler died at age 73 in El Sereno, California.

Filmography
The Big Broadcast (1932)
Madame Racketeer (1932)
Gold Rush Maisie (1940)
Redhead (1941)
Tennessee Johnson (1942)
Thumbs Up (1943)
Master Minds (1949)

Partial discography
COLUMBIA A1950 (78) She’s Good Enough to Be Your Baby’s Mother (and She’s Good Enough to Vote With You) 

COLUMBIA A1956 (78) You Can't Get Along With 'Em or without 'Em (recorded January 20, 1916)

EDISON 51193-R (78) My Sweetie Went Away (He Didn't Say Where, When or Why)

Sheet music

(With her picture on cover)
(Yr Unk) – Hello Wisconsin (Won't You Find My Yonnie Yonson
1915 – America I Love You
1916 – Rolling Stones (All Come Rolling Home Again) - Words by Edgar Leslie ; Music by Archie Gottler
1917 – Yankee Doodle Learns Parlez Vous Francais1917 – You've Certainly Opened My Eyes1917 – Never Was A Lass Like You1917 – ... Somewhere In France1920 – Feather Your Nest1921 – Scandinavia1922 – I've Got The Love-Sick Blues, Jack Mills, Inc., publisher
1922 – Lost (A Wonderful Girl)1922 – Lovin Sam (The Sheik of Alabam)1923 – AnnabelleReferences
Inline citations

General references
 Biography Index. A cumulative index to biographical material in books and magazines. Volume 6: September 1961 – August 1964, New York: H.W. Wilson Co. (1965)
 Who Was Who on Screen, First edition, by Evelyn Mack Truitt, New York: R.R. Bowker (1974)
 Who Was Who on Screen, Second edition, by Evelyn Mack Truitt, New York: R.R. Bowker (1977)
 Who Was Who on Screen, Third edition, by Evelyn Mack Truitt, New York: R.R. Bowker (1983)
 Who's Who in Hollywood, 1900-1976, by David Ragan. New Rochelle, NY: Arlington House Publishers (1976), The Late Players (1900-1974) section begins on page 539
 Who's Who in Hollywood, The largest cast of international film personalities ever assembled,'' Two volumes, by David Ragan, New York: Facts on File (1992)

External links

 
 
Anna Chandler cylinder recordings, from the UCSB Cylinder Audio Archive at the University of California, Santa Barbara Library.

1884 births
1957 deaths
American stage actresses
American film actresses
American mezzo-sopranos
20th-century American actresses
20th-century American women singers
20th-century American singers
Columbia Records artists